Statistics of Czechoslovak First League in the 1969–70 season.

Overview
It was contested by 16 teams, and ŠK Slovan Bratislava won the championship. Jozef Adamec was the league's top scorer with 18 goals.

Stadia and locations

League standings

Results

Top goalscorers

References

Czechoslovakia - List of final tables (RSSSF)

Czechoslovak First League seasons
Czech
1969–70 in Czechoslovak football